Siri Kaur is an artist/photographer who lives and works in Los Angeles, where she also serves as associate professor at Otis College of Art and Design. She received an MFA in photography from California Institute of the Arts in 2007, an MA in Italian studies in 2001 from Smith College/Universita’ di Firenze, Florence, Italy,  and BA in comparative literature from Smith College in 1998. Kaur was the recipient of the Portland Museum of Art Biennial Purchase Prize in 2011. She regularly exhibits and has had solo shows at Blythe Projects and USC's 3001 galleries in Los Angeles, and group shows at the Torrance Museum of Art, California Institute of Technology, and UCLA’s Wight Biennial. Her work has been reviewed in Artforum, art ltd., The L.A. Times, and The Washington Post, and is housed in the permanent collections of the National Gallery in Washington, D.C. and the University of Maine.

Solo exhibitions
 SHE TELLS ALL, Eric Buterbaugh Gallery, Los Angeles, CA, 2019
 Upper Layers, El Clasificado, Los Angeles, CA and Venice, Italy, 2019
 Crow’s Field, Vermont Center for Photography, Brattleboro, VT, 2018
 Urban Lights: 10th Anniversary Portraits, Art Catalogs LACMA, Los Angeles CountyMuseum of Art, Los Angeles, CA, 2018
 Crow’s Field, Kopeikin Gallery, Los Angeles, CA,2017.
 This Kind of Face, Cohen Gallery, Los Angeles, CA, 2015.[1][1][1][1]
 This Kind of Face, 99¢ Plus, New York, NY
 Rob and Heather and Chris and Otto and Koral…, Vermont Center for  Photography, Brattleboro, VT
Know Me for the First Time, Blythe Projects, Los Angeles, CA (catalog), 2013.
Field Trip, 3001 Gallery, Roski School of Art, University of Southern California, Los Angeles, CA, 2013.
More Than or Equal to Half of the Whole (with Kate Johnson), Garboushian Gallery, Beverly Hills, CA, 2013.[3][3][3][3]
I too was in Arcadia, Gallery 825, Los Angeles, CA, 2008
Cruiserweight, D300 Gallery, California Institute of The Arts, Valencia, CA, 2007.
The Collectors, L-Shape Gallery, California Institute of The Arts, Valencia, CA, 2006.

Selected group exhibitions 
2022
 Golden Hour: California Photography from the Los Angeles County Museum of Art, California State University, Northridge, Art Gallery, Northridge, CA, curated by Eve Schillo
2021
 Garden, Ladies' Room, Los Angeles, CA
 Golden Hour: California Photography from the Los Angeles County Museum of Art, Vincent Price Art Museum, East Los Angeles College, Los Angeles, CA, curated by Eve Schillo
 Golden Hour: California Photography from the Los Angeles County Museum of Art, Riverside Art Museum, Riverside, CA, curated by Eve Schillo
 Golden Hour: California Photography from the Los Angeles County Museum of Art, Lancaster Museum of Art and History, Lancaster, CA, curated by Eve Schillo
 Every Woman Biennial, Superchief Gallery, New York, NY
2020
 Men of Steel, Women of Wonder, Addison Gallery of American Art, Andover, MA
2019
 Men of Steel, Women of Wonder, San Antonio Museum of Art, San Antonio, TX
 A Secret, River Gallery, Los Angeles, CA and Berlin, Germany
 Every Woman Biennial, Bendix Building, Los Angeles
 Men of Steel, Women of Wonder, Crystal Bridges Museum of American Art, Bentonville, AR
 Keeping up with the Gagosians, El Clasificado, Los Angeles, CA
2018
 Super Radiance, The Nook Gallery, Los Angeles, CA
 Anti-Nostalgia, The Carrack Modern, Durham, NC
 Covers, The Bloke, Pasadena, CA (curated by Justin Cole)
2017
 Back to School, Los Angeles Center of Photography, Los Angeles, CA
 Greetings From, The Art Barge, Amagansett, NY
2016
 INFOCUS: Second Triennial of Self-Published Photobooks, Phoenix Art Museum, Phoenix, AZ
 Postage Required, Vermont Center for Photography, Brattleboro, VT
 The Last Four Years, Stephen Cohen Gallery, Los Angeles, CA
 To Whom it May Concern, 99¢ Plus, New York, NY
2015
 Directors’ Cut: Selections from Maine Art Museums, Portland Museum of Art, Portland, ME
 Neo-Pre-Post-Contra-Para-Anti-Hyper-Pro-Trans-Ultra-Photography, Spectre Arts, Durham, NC
2014		
 INFOCUS: Self-Published Photobooks, Phoenix Art Museum, Phoenix, AZ
 Of the Afternoon, Darnley Gallery, London, UK
 Summer Open, Aperture Foundation, New York, NY
 99¢ Plus!, 99¢ Plus, New York, NY
 24/7 (still life), Stephen Cohen Gallery, Los Angeles, CA
 A Forest: Cathy Ackers, Annie Buckley, Anita Bunn, Siri Kaur, 2A Gallery, Los Angeles, CA
 From Her, El Pueblo Historical Monument, Los Angeles, CA
2013	
 Influenced by the Sun, Stephen Cohen Gallery, Los Angeles, CA 
 Staking Claim: The California Triennial of Photography, Museum of Photographic Arts, San Diego, CA 
 Falling From Great Heights: Siri Kaur, John Knuth, Heather Rasmussen, Stephen Cohen Gallery, Los Angeles, CA
 Out of Thin Air, LAX, Los Angeles, CA
2012		
 Siri Kaur, Soo Kim, and Christina Ondrus, Woodbury University Gallery, Hollywood, CA 
2011	
 Pissed Elegance, Stephen Cohen Gallery, Los Angeles, CA
 Cosmic Prom, Vortex Immersion Dome, Los Angeles, CA	
 Chain Letter, Shoshana Wayne Gallery, Los Angeles, CA
 Too True, POST, Los Angeles, CA (catalog)
 Nuove Opere, U-Skill Gallery, Rome, Italy
 The Series, The Standard Hotel, Los Angeles, CA
 Fuck Pretty, Robert Berman Gallery, Santa Monica, CA
 Redefining Hollywood, The Factory at Fabrik Magazine, Los Angeles, CA
 Play Time, See Line Gallery at the Pacific Design Center, Los Angeles, CA
 Sing Me to Sleep, Angles Gallery, Los Angeles, CA
 Curious Silence, Brand Library Gallery, Glendale, CA (catalog)
 2011 Biennial, Portland Museum of Art, Portland, ME (catalog)
2010
 (Por)trait Revealed, RayKo Photo Center, San Francisco, CA
 See-Thru, Gallery 825 and The Icon, Los Angeles, CA (catalog)
 Altimetry, curated by Mark Steven Greenfield, LAX and Los Angeles Municipal Art Gallery, Los Angeles, CA
 Contemporary Art RUHR Projects, Ruhr, Germany
 Outside the Project, curated by Jess Minckley, RAID Projects and Light & Wire Gallery, Los Angeles, CA (catalog)
 Curious Silence, curated by Renee Martin & Heather Rasmussen, SOIL Gallery, Seattle, WA
 Perspective, curated by Paula Tognarelli, Center for Fine Art Photography, Fort Collins, CO
 More with Less, curated by Kristina Newhouse & Robert Brander Gallery 825, Los Angeles, CA
2008		
 Truth or Dare, curated by Craig Krull, Gallery 825, Los Angeles, CA
 In the Bedroom, curated by Marty Weiss, Meter Gallery, New York, NY
 Members Only, curated by Keith Carter, Dishman Art Museum, Beaumont, TX
 Everyone’s a Curator, Telic Gallery, Los Angeles, CA		
 Conventions and Attitudes, curated by Karen Atkinson, Trade & Row, Los Angeles, CA
 Projection, curated by Maria Jenson, Salon Oblique, Santa Monica, CA
2007		
 All In, curated by Lorraine Molina, Torrance Museum of Art, Torrance, CA
 My Buddy, UCLA Wight Biennial, curated by Russell Ferguson, UCLA Wight Gallery, Los Angeles, CA
 You are Beautiful, Hayworth Gallery, Los Angeles, CA
 For Ever, curated by Eungie Joo, 915 Mateo, Los Angeles, CA
 Making Meaning, curated by Howard Fox, Gallery 825, Los Angeles, CA
2006		
 Mid-Residency Show, California Institute of the Arts, Valencia, CA
 Open Show, curated by Ann Philbin, Gallery 825, Los Angeles, CA
 I Would Be You, Newspace Gallery, Portland, Oregon
 Photography Now, curated by Natasha Lunn, 401 Projects & Center for Photography at Woodstock, New York, NY & Woodstock, NY
2006 
 NOW, Soho Photo Gallery, New York, NY
2005		
 Nothing to See Here, curated by Walead Beshty, Art 2102, Los Angeles, CA
 New Photography, Riverside Metropolitan Art Museum, Riverside, CA
 Beauty, Women in Photography International, New York, NY
 In Focus: Photography Techniques and Trends, Target Gallery, Alexandria, VA
 Photography Now, Newspace Center for Photography, Portland, OR
 The Image is the Message, DreamBox Photo Gallery, Chicago, IL
 National Women’s Show, Washington Gallery of Photography, Bethesda, MD	 
2004		
 Virtual*Visual, Women in Photography International, New York, NY/ Los Angeles, CA

Collections 
 Crystal Bridges Museum of American Art
 Los Angeles County Museum of Art
Houston Museum of Fine Arts, Houston, TX
 National Portrait Gallery, Washington D.C.
 Portland Museum of Art, Portland, ME
 University of Maine Art Museum, Orono, ME
 Washington Gallery of Photography, Washington, D.C.
 Collection of Lawrence Gagosian
 Collection of Oprah Winfrey

Awards and grants 
 Charcoal Publishing Prize, 2020
 COLA Grant Artist Portraits, 12 portraits for COLA grants catalog, 2012
 Center for Cultural Innovation/ Durfee Grant, 2011
 Portland Museum of Art Biennial Purchase Prize, 2006
 California Institute of the Arts Merit Scholarship, 2006
 Critical Mass Publishing Prize Finalist, 2005

Residencies 
 The Arctic Circle, Svalbard, Greenland, 2023
 Bonfire, Reykjavik, Iceland, 2022
 Bakery Photographic Collective, Westbrook, ME, 2009

Bibliography 

 Delaney Hoffman, “SHE TELLS ALL: Practice and Portraiture”, photoeye.com, Feb. 3, 2022
 Johanna Drucker, “Illuminating Images: Liquid Light and Golden Hour and the Affective Force of Non-Didactic Art”, Riot Material, Jan. 7, 2022
 Jessica Hundley and Pam Grossman, “Divination: Seeing Within,” in The Library of Esoterica: Witchcraft, Jessica Hundley and Pam Grossman, ed., (Taschen, 2021): 424-425
 Harriet- Lloyd-Smith, “The Every Woman Biennial is a transatlantic triumph,” Wallpaper Magazine, June 14, 2021
 Aline Smithson, “Siri Kaur: SHE TELLS ALL,” Lenscratch, Mar. 19, 2020
 Nate Rynaski, “Siri Kaur, SHE TELLS ALL,” Flaunt Magazine, Oct. 29, 2019
 Shana Nys Dambrot, “Meet an Artist Monday: Siri Kaur,” LA Weekly, Oct 28, 2019
 “Art & Life with Siri Kaur”, Voyage LA Magazine, January 2, 2019   
Serena McKay, “Crystal Bridges exhibit aims to lasso truth of heroes’ roots,” Arkansas Democrat Gazette, Little Rock, AR, Feb. 9, 2019
Peter Saenger, “Supermen and Wonder Women: Artists reimagine comic-book heroes with admiration and irreverence”, The Wall Street Journal, New York, NY, January 19-20, 2019. C14
Caleb Talley, “Men of Steel, Women of Wonder,” About You Magazine, Jan. 24, 2019
Rebecca Morse, “Institutionally Antiestablishment,” in 27 L.A. Photographers, Rebecca Morse, ed., (Los Angeles County Museum of Art Press, 2018): 6-12, 30-31
Gwynedd Stuart, “LACMA Celebrates 10 Years of Urban Light with a Beautiful Photo Series,” Los Angeles Magazine, February 9, 2018
Taylor Curry, “Siri Kaur,” Ain’t Bad Magazine, January 28, 2018
Genie Davis, “Siri Kaur and Rebecca Bird at Kopeikin Gallery,” Art and Cake, April 16, 2017
Josh Hagler, “Other Faiths, Part 1 + 2” Venison Quarterly, Spring 2017
Holly Hughes, “Memories of Crow’s Field,” Photo District News, March 13, 2017
Aline Smithson, “Siri Kaur: Crow’s Field, “Lenscratch, March 11, 2017
Kristen Osborne-Bartucca, “Siri Kaur,” Artillery Magazine, Jan/ Feb 2015, p. 70
Shana Nys Dambrot, “Top Ten Critic’s Picks of 2014,” art ltd., Jan/ Feb 2015, p. 51
Catherine Opie, “Vanity: a special section curated by Catherine Opie,” Musee Magazine, Issue 11, April 2015, p. 290-291
Matthew Stromberg, “Photo LA,” Hyperallergic, Jan. 19, 2015
Ken Weingart, “Interview with Photographer Siri Kaur,” petapixel.com, February 19, 2015
Christine Santa Ana and Phil Anderson, Of the Afternoon, Issue 6 (September 2014): 30
Christina Procter, “Zealous Eyes,” Trend art +design +architecture Magazine, Issue 1, June 2014, p. 18
Thea Traff, “Seeing Double,” The New Yorker, November 26, 2014
Bill Bush, “Falling From Great Heights,” Huffington Post, March 26, 2013   
Paul Caridad, “Film Photography of Galaxies through a Telescope,” Visual News, May 14, 2013
Amanda Gorence, “Ethereal Photos of Distant Galaxies,” Feature Shoot, May 14, 2013
Nicholas Grider, “Crow’s Field,” Public Display Magazine, March 2013
Catlin Moore, “Emergent Presence: Siri Kaur” in Eight LA Artists You Should Know, Fabrik Magazine, Issue 20, April 2013. 44-45
A. Moret, “Siri Kaur,” Installation Magazine, “California” Issue (July 2013): 8
Holly Myers, “Photographs that Say ‘yes/and’,” The Los Angeles Times, Los Angeles, CA, April 26, 2013. D16
Bianca Rocco, “Siri Kaur Captures the Galaxies: Telescope Photography,” Quixote, August 14, 2013
Matt Stromberg, “Outer Spaces, Los Angeles: Falling from Great Heights,” Art Practical, April 14, 2013
Maya Sugarman, “The Color of Space,” Audiovision, KPCC.org, May 9, 2013
Phil Tarley,  “Cohen Gallery Exhibition: Falling from Great Heights,” Fabrik Magazine, Issue 20, April 2013. 68-73
Westerbeck, Colin, “All Together Now! Themes and Shared Concerns in Staking Claim: A California Invitational,” in Staking Claim: A California Invitational, Chantel Paul, ed., (Museum of Photographic Arts Press, San Diego, 2011): 4–7
Leonardo Bravo, “Big City Forum: Interview with Soo Kim, Siri Kaur, and Christina Ondrus,” KCET’s Artbound, October 22, 2012
For Your Art, “Big City Forum: The Hub,” October 11, 2012    
Marnie Hanel, “Hella Cool,” Marie Claire 19, issue no. 6 (June 2012): 131   
Natalie Hegert, “Does Photography Matter?,” Artslant, Los Angeles Art Special Edition 2012, January 14, 2012   
A. Moret, “Looking Forward into the Past,” Installation Magazine, In Blank We Trust Issue (May 2012): 28-33
Daniel Rolnik, “Photo LA,” Argot & Ochre, January 13, 2012
Artforum.com News, “Portland Art Museum Awards Biennial Prizes,” April 8, 2011
Edgar Al len Beem, “The Art Forecast: No Shortage of Discoveries in Portland Museum of Art Biennial,” The Forecaster, Portland, ME, April 4, 2011.
Shana Nys Dambrot, “Fuck Pretty at Robert Berman Gallery,” art ltd., Sep./Oct. 2011. 35.
Shana Nys Dambrot, “Critic’s Picks Los Angeles: Siri Kaur,” art ltd., Nov./Dec. 2011. 48-49.
Travis Diehl, “Critic’s Picks,” artforum.com, Feb. 7, 2011   
For Your Art, “Know Me For the First Time,” October 27, 2011
Peter Frank, “Haiku Review,” The Huffington Post, Aug. 12, 2011
Daniel Kany, “Every Decade or so, PMA’s Biennial is Extra Special,” Portland Press Herald/ Maine Sunday Telegraph, April 17, 2011. D5
Bob Keyes, “It’s That Time Again,” Portland Press Herald/ Maine Sunday Telegraph, April 3, 2011. D1-D2
Annie Larmon and Nicholas Schroder, “Touring the PMA’s Biennial,” The Portland Phoenix, April 13, 2011
Anne Martens, “Contemporary Art RUHR,” Artillery Magazine, Volume 5 Issue 4, March/April 2011. 42-43
Thomas Meaney, Menace and Wonder, in “Know Me for the First Time,” (Los Angeles, CA, Icon Books, 2011): 5–8
Leah Ollman, “Art Review: Siri Kaur at Blythe Projects,” The Los Angeles Times, Nov. 10, 2011. D21
Portland Press Herald, “Purchase Prizes Awarded at Launching of Art Biennial,” April 7, 2011. B2
Ray Routhier, “Five Artists Receive Purchase Prizes at Portland Museum of Art 2011
Biennial Opening,” Portland Press Herald, Portland, ME, April 10, 2011. D2
Katie Shapiro, “A Poetic Counter-World Photographed by Siri Kaur,” Feature Shoot, Nov. 29, 2011
Sebastian Smee, “Biennial Hits,” The Boston Globe, Boston, MA, May 8, 2011. B3
Aline Smithson, “Siri Kaur,” Lenscratch, Thursday, Oct. 20, 2011
Greg Cookland, “Portland Museum of Art,” New England Journal of Aesthetic Research, October 7, 2010
Bob Keyes, "Museum of Art Picks 47 Artists for Biennial Show," Portland Press Herald, Portland, ME, October 4, 2010. D3
Cary Berglund, Interview, NBC Channel 4 News, Los Angeles, CA, April 10, 2009
Zoe Crosher, “Interrupting the Imaginary Inside the Ship of My Imagination,” Art Lies Quarterly, no.61 (Spring 2009): 24–27
Laurel Ptak, “Siri Kaur,” Iheartphotograph, January 20, 2009
Laurel Ptak, Iheartphotograph.com, March 10, 2009
Aline Smithson, lenscratch.com, January 21, 2009
Page Weary, “Gallery 825,” Artillery Magazine, Los Angeles, CA, 2009
Peter Mays, “Sustaining Emerging Artist’s Communities,” THE Magazine, Los Angeles, CA, October 2008
Harris Fogel, “Thoughts On Photography,” Houston Center for Photography Quarterly, Winter 2007
John Rabe & Queena Kim, Interview, Offramp, 89.3 KPCC, Los Angeles, CA, January 6, 2007
Jay DeFoore, “Emerging Photographers,” American Photo, June 2006
Curtis Clarkson, CMYK Magazine #31, New York, NY, 2005. 41
Curtis Clarkson, CMYK Magazine #30, New York, NY, 2005. 48
Joerg Colberg, “Siri Kaur: Contemporary Photographers,” Conscientious, October 7, 2005    
Jessica Dawson, “Through A Lens Starkly,” The Washington Post, Washington, D.C., June 16, 2005. C5
John Motley, “New Photography,” The Portland Mercury, Portland, OR, 2005
Holly Hughes, “Photo Annual,” Photo District News, May 2005. 157

Publications as author 

 “This Kind of Face,” (Los Angeles, CA, Leroy Press, 2014)
“Tanja Hollander: A Photographer’s Attempt to Photograph 687 Facebook Friends,”  Feature Shoot, June 20, 2013
“Heather Rasmussen: Photographer Recreates Disasters and Accidents Involving Shipping Containers,” Feature Shoot, June 24, 2013
“Know Me for the First Time,” (Los Angeles, CA, Icon Books, 2011)
“Siri Kaur,” in 2011 Portland Museum of Art Biennial, Mark Bessire, ed., (Portland Museum of Art Press, Portland, ME, 2011): 64–65
“Do You Want to Make a Picture Book?,” Words Without Pictures, Alex Klein, ed. (New York, NY, Aperture, 2010): 172–174
“Il Sogno del Paradiso Terrestre: Il Poema Pastorale e il Giardino nel Rinascimento Italiano (Dream of an Earthly Paradise: Pastoral Poetry and the Garden in the Italian Renaissance),” (Northampton, MA, Smith College Press, 2001)

Academic appointments 
2021–2022       Visiting faculty, School of Arts and Architecture, University of California Los Angeles, Los Angeles, CA
2014–2018       Associate professor, Fine Arts and Foundation Programs, Otis College of Art and Design, Los Angeles, CA
2010–2014       Assistant professor, Fine Arts and Foundation Programs, Otis College of Art and Design, Los Angeles, CA
2007–2010       Visiting lecturer, Fine Art and Foundation Programs, Otis College of Art and Design, Los Angeles, CA
2005–2007       Teaching assistant, Foundation Photography, California Institute of the Arts, Valencia, CA

References

American contemporary artists
Living people
American photographers
American women photographers
Conceptual photographers
Otis College of Art and Design faculty
1976 births
American women academics
21st-century American women